Joseph Musanyufu, is a lieutenant general in the Uganda People's Defence Force,(UPDF), who serves as the joint chief of staff of the UPDF, the third highest rank in the  military who is known to have only one son Musanyufu C junior. Immediately prior to his present position, Musanyufu served as the chief of personnel and administration in the UPDF, a position that he was appointed to in 2014.

Musanyufu replaced Wilson Mbadi, who was promoted to the rank of lieutenant general and appointed as deputy chief of defence forces in the UPDF. Musanyufu, who was a brigadier prior to his current appointment, was promoted to major general at the time he was appointed as joint chief of staff.

Background and education
He was born circa 1962 in present-day Bushenyi District, in Uganda's Western Region. Prior to joining the military, he studied at Kitabi Seminary, in Bushenyi District and Ntare School in Mbarara District becoming one of the top students in his year. He later went to Makerere University graduating with 1st-class honors bachelor's degree in economics.

During his service in the UPDF, he attended a senior command course at a staff college in the United States and staff college at Royal Military College Sandhurst [United Kingdom] and another course at the National Defense College in India.

Career
In August 1985, Musanyufu joined the National Resistance Army, the precursor to the UPDF. At that time, his recruit class included James Mugira, Shaban Bantariza and David Muhoozi. He at one time served as an ADC to Mugisha Muntu, then the commander of the Ugandan military. Musanyufu also served as the deputy to the late Nobel Mayombo, at the time Mayombo served as the chief of military intelligence.

Later, Musanyufu served as chief comptroller finance of the UPDF and then as chief of integrated resource management information system. In his new role as the UPDF joint chief of staff, he is a close military adviser to the president of Uganda, who is also the commander in chief of the UPDF.

On 8 February 2019, over 2,000 UPDF men and women were promoted on one day. That day Joseph Musanyufu was promoted from the rank of major general to that of lieutenant general.

See also
 Dick Olum
 Leopold Kyanda

References

External links
 Website of Uganda Ministry of Defence
 Inside Museveni’s UPDF reshuffle

Living people
Ankole people
1962 births
People from Bushenyi District
People from Western Region, Uganda
Ugandan military personnel
Ugandan generals
National Defence College, India alumni